Adam Curry (born 21 May 1997) is an English footballer who most recently played for Hull City.

He was released by Hull City at the end of the 2018–19 season.

Career statistics

References

External links
Adam Curry at Footballdatabase

English footballers
1997 births
Living people
Association football midfielders
Hull City A.F.C. players
Boston United F.C. players
Spennymoor Town F.C. players
Alfreton Town F.C. players
Matlock Town F.C. players
National League (English football) players